The Cincinnati Conservatory of Music was a conservatory, part of a girls' finishing school, founded in 1867 in Cincinnati, Ohio. It merged with the College of Music of Cincinnati in 1955, forming the Cincinnati College-Conservatory of Music, which is now part of the University of Cincinnati.

The Conservatory, founded by Clara Baur, was the first music school in Cincinnati.  In 1924, Mr. Burnet Corwin Tuthill, General Manager of the Conservatory, instigated the formation of the National Association of Schools of Music together with five other institutions (American Conservatory of Music, Bush Conservatory of Music, Louisville Conservatory of Music, Pittsburgh Musical Institute, and Walcott Conservatory of Music) at a meeting held on June 10, 1924.

The Cincinnati Conservatory of Music, Inc., became an institutional member of the National Association of Schools of Music on February 1, 1930. Its certificate was signed by the President, Harold L. Bulter and Secretary, Burnet M. Bushelf.

Noted alumni include singer and actor Aaron Lazar, trumpeter Al Hirt, jazz pianist Pat Moran McCoy, singer and entertainer Tennessee Ernie Ford, composers Harold Morris, Conlon Nancarrow, Margaret McClure Stitt, and Christy Altomare of Spring Awakening fame, as well as pathologist Aldred Scott Warthin.

Notable alumni
 James G. Heller (1892-1971), rabbi and composer, professor of musicology at Conservatory
 Corinne Stocker Horton (1871-1947), elocutionist, journalist, newspaper editor, and clubwoman
 Carrie Obendorfer Simon (1872-1961), communal leader

References

Notes

History of Cincinnati
Educational institutions established in 1867
Music schools in Ohio
University of Cincinnati
1867 establishments in Ohio
Educational institutions disestablished in 1955
1955 disestablishments in Ohio
Arts organizations established in 1867
Music of Cincinnati